Viellard Migeon & Compagnie is a French manufacturer of the steel products, especially for fishermen. The company history dates back to 1676, it is owned and managed by the Viellard family for more than 200 years. Due to its longevity it is a part the Henokiens association.

The company is well known for its angling equipment.

See also 
Henokiens

References 

Article contains translated text from Viellard-Migeon et Cie on the French Wikipedia retrieved on 1 April 2017.

External links 
Homepage
FSH Welding Group

Fishing equipment manufacturers
French companies established in 1796
1796 establishments in France
Manufacturing companies established in 1796